Koopman's rat (Rattus koopmani) is a species of rodent in the family Muridae.
It is found only on Peleng island, located in the Banggai Islands (Kepulauan Banggai) off the southeastern coast of Sulawesi, Indonesia.

References

Rattus
Rodents of Sulawesi
Mammals described in 1991
Taxonomy articles created by Polbot